The 1904 United States presidential election in Colorado took place on November 8, 1904. All contemporary 45 states were part of the 1904 United States presidential election. State voters chose five electors to the Electoral College, which selected the president and vice president.

Colorado was won by the Republican nominees, incumbent President Theodore Roosevelt of New York and his running mate Charles W. Fairbanks of Indiana.

Roosevelt's victory in Colorado was part of a national landslide. He was the only Republican candidate to win the state between 1888 and 1920.

Results

Results by county

Notes

References

Colorado
1904
1904 Colorado elections